Ahmed Lamlas (born 1970 ) is a Yemeni politician currently serving as a minister of state and governor of Aden.

Political Career 
He was born in 1970 in Shabwah. He held many positions, including the director of Shaikh Outhman District in 2003, Al-Mansoura District in 2007, and Khur Maksar in 2012. He was appointed as the governor of Shabwah in 2016 and Aden in 2020. He has been a member of state since 2022.

References 

1970 births

Governors of Aden
People from Shabwah Governorate
Yemeni ministers of state
21st-century Yemeni politicians
Governors of Shabwah Governorate
Living people